The 2008–09 season was the 118th season in the history of K.V. Mechelen and the club's third consecutive season in the top flight of Belgian football. In addition to the domestic league, K.V. Mechelen participated in this season's edition of the Belgian Cup.

Competitions

Overall record

Belgian First Division

League table

Results summary

Results by round

Matches

Belgian Cup

References

K.V. Mechelen seasons
Mechelen